Théo Le Bris (born 1 October 2002) is a French professional footballer who plays as a right-back for Lorient.

Career
A youth product of Lorient, Le Bris began his senior career with their reserves, and started training with their first team in 2021. He made his professional debut with Lorient in a 2–1 Ligue 1 win over Lille OSC on 10 September 2021.

Personal life
Théo was born in a family of footballer players; his father Benoît and uncle Régis, who is his current coach at Lorient, were professional footballers in France.

References

External links
 

2002 births
Living people
Footballers from Rennes
French footballers
Association football fullbacks
Ligue 1 players
Championnat National 2 players
FC Lorient players